Bahr el Gazel was formerly a department in the Kanem Region of Chad.

In 2008 the former department was split from Kanem to become a new region of the same name.

The capital of the former department and new region is Moussoro.

Sub-divisions
The department was divided into six sub-prefectures:
 Amsileb 
 Chadra 
 Mandjoura 
 Michemire 
 Moussoro 
 Salal

References 

Former departments of Chad
Kanem Region

bg:Бар ел Газел
da:Barh El Gazel
fr:Barh El Gazel
pt:Barh El Gazel